is a Japanese anime film based on Hans Christian Andersen's 1837 fairy tale, released in 1975 by Toei Animation. Unlike the Disney adaptation released 14 years later, this film is closer to Andersen's story, notably in its preservation of the original and tragic ending. The two main protagonists are the youngest daughter of the royal family, Marina, and her best friend Fritz, an Atlantic dolphin calf. In Japan, this film was shown in the Toei Manga Matsuri (Toei Cartoon Festival) in 1975.

The film was later released in the United States, dubbed into English by G. G. Communications, Inc. and Prima Film, Inc., on February 4, 1978, under the title: Hans Christian Anderson's The Little Mermaid. (Andersen's name would be correctly spelled in subsequent releases.)

Plot
The movie opens in live-action Denmark. The narrator mentions Hans Christian Andersen, who is from there, and his original story. The scene then dissolves to 2-D hand-drawn anime.

Princess Marina, who lives in the undersea kingdom with her father, grandmother and five older sisters, plays with her best friend Fritz, a dolphin, before getting caught in a storm conjured by the Sea Witch. Once home, she is scolded by her sisters for being late, reminding her that their grandmother will not give her the pearl hairpin that signifies adulthood unless she is responsible. The following day, Marina's sisters go to the surface. Marina is forbidden to go because she has not yet come of age. While exploring a sunken ship, Marina discovers a statue of a human prince. She and Fritz sneak to the surface, where she sees the same prince on a ship.

Another storm arises and throws the prince into the sea. Marina saves him and brings him to shore, leaving him there to be found. A raven-haired girl finds the prince and cares for him. Because of her rescue of a human, Marina's grandmother decides that she is ready to come of age, and Marina receives her pearl hairpin.

Determined to see the prince again and gain an immortal soul, Marina visits the Sea Witch, who gives her a potion that will make her human, although in exchange, she must give the Sea Witch her beautiful voice and will never be able to become a mermaid again. The Sea Witch warns her that if the prince marries another, she will die and dissolve into sea foam the next morning. After a heartfelt goodbye to her family and Fritz, Marina drinks the potion and is transformed.

She is discovered by the prince on the shore, and lives with him for a month. The two become close and the prince tells her that his parents want him to marry a foreign princess but he wants to marry the girl who saved his life. Since he cannot find her, he wishes to marry Marina. The prince's jealous cat, Jemmy, who vows to get rid of Marina, reports the conversation to the prince's parents, and the queen suspects that Marina has bewitched her son. When the foreign princess arrives, the prince's father orders Marina to be arrested for treason. The prince recognizes the foreign princess as the same raven-haired girl who had supposedly saved him. They are soon to be married.

Heartbroken, Marina summons Fritz so that she can say goodbye. Fritz vows to find a way to save her. Marina's sisters, having given their hair to the Sea Witch in exchange for a magic dagger, give her the dagger. They tell her that if she stabs the prince through the heart and lets his blood drip onto her feet, she will become a mermaid again. With dawn only minutes away, Marina sneaks into the prince's room but cannot bring herself to kill him. She kisses him goodbye as he sleeps.

As she throws the dagger into the sea, the reflection wakes the prince. He rushes onto the deck, calling after her, but she jumps. As he calls her name, he sees that she has left behind her pearl hairpin and a scale from her tail. As the sun rises, her body turns to foam and ascends into the sky. The prince realizes that Marina was the girl who had saved his life, and grieves her death. Marina's spirit lives on in heaven for her self-sacrifice.

The movie fades back to live-action in Denmark, and the narrator expresses belief that the mermaid princess has become one with the sea and waves and her love and courage forever lives on. The movie ends on a still shot of the Little Mermaid statue in Copenhagen.

Main characters
 Marina, 14 years old, is princess of the undersea kingdom and the youngest of six daughters. She is a blond, sweet and beautiful mermaid and is known for having the most beautiful voice in the kingdom. She is curious about the human world and likes collecting items that come from the surface. She falls in love with a human prince and sacrifices her beautiful voice in order to be with him.
 Fritz is a blue Atlantic dolphin calf, and Marina's best friend.
 Brave and well-trained in the military arts, the Prince dislikes the idea of an arranged marriage. After surviving a shipwreck, he becomes obsessed with finding the girl who saved his life.
 {{nihongo| The Sea Witch |魔女|Majo}}Unlike in other versions of the story, the Sea Witch is not evil, but she is shrewd. She has no specific interest in harming anyone, but can be very destructive in creating storms that sink ships. She is a gigantic devil ray.
 The raven-haired princess of the Kingdom of Finland. She is the girl who finds the prince on the shore after Marina brings him to land, subsequently making him think that she was the one who saved him.
 {{nihongo| Jemmy the Cat|ジェミー|Jemī}}The main antagonist of the story, despite being the Prince's loyal cat, Jemmy tries to get rid of Marina, first by killing her and then by accusing her of manipulating the prince.

Music

Opening theme

 Sung by Kumiko Osugi, lyrics by Tokiko Iwatani, music and arrangement by Takekuni Hirayoshi.

Inserted song
; "Marina's Song" in the English version.
 Sung by Kumiko Osugi and people, lyrics by Tokiko Iwatani, music and arrangement by Takekuni Hirayoshi.

Voice cast

Additional English Voices
 Jeannette Casenave
 Terry Haig
 Neil Shee

Release titles
 Andersen dôwa ningyo hime (Japan) (alternative transliteration)
 Hans Christian Anderson's The Little Mermaid (USA) (theatrical title)
 Hans Christian Andersen's The Little Mermaid (USA) (video box title)
 The Little Mermaid (international: English title)

Home releases
The film was originally released on VHS by Starmaker Entertainment in 1989. It was sold as a full version of the original film under the title Hans Christian Andersen's The Little Mermaid. The film was released on Region 1 (USA and Canada) DVD by UAV Corporation under the name "The Little Mermaid: Based on Hans Christian Andersen's Classic Tale." The cover art differs significantly from that of the original Starmaker release. However, multiple reviewers on Amazon.com state that the actual film on the DVD is the Toei film (albeit somewhat censored). The reviewers' images also depict scenes from the original 1975 Toei film. The film is now licensed by Discotek Media, which released the full, uncut film on Region 1 DVD, making it the first time that the full film has been available in the U.S. since the original VHS release. The DVD includes the original Japanese audio with English subtitles and the English dub, and presents the film in its original aspect ratio.

Internet release
The Japanese version can be viewed on several media websites, including Yahoo! Japan, but IP addresses not based in Japan are blocked from viewing it.

References

External links
 
 
 Retrojunk article/review of the original U.S. version

1975 anime films
Anime and manga based on fairy tales
Drama anime and manga
Adventure anime and manga
Films based on The Little Mermaid
Films directed by Tomoharu Katsumata
Toei Animation films
Toei Company films
Films about witchcraft
Fictional princesses
Discotek Media
Japanese animated fantasy films
Films set in Denmark
Films set in Copenhagen
Films about mermaids
Films about shapeshifting